Pierre Lhomme (5 April 1930 – 4 July 2019) was a French cinematographer and filmmaker.

Filmography
2002 : Le Divorce by James Ivory
1999 : Cotton Mary by Ismail Merchant
1998 : Voleur de vie by Yves Angelo
1997 : Les Palmes de Monsieur Schultz by Claude Pinoteau
1996 : Anna Oz by Éric Rochant
1996 : Mon homme by Bertrand Blier
1994 : Jefferson in Paris by James Ivory
1994 : Oh God, Women Are So Loving by Magali Clément
1992 : Toxic Affair by Philomène Esposito
1992 : Promenade d'été by René Féret
1991 : The Voyager by Volker Schlöndorff
1990 : Cyrano de Bergerac by Jean-Paul Rappeneau - Won for César Awards Best Photography / BAFTA BSC Award
1989 : Baptême by René Féret - Won : 1 er prix de l'image à Chalon-sur-Saône
1988 : Camille Claudel by Bruno Nuytten - Won for César Awards Best Photography
1987 : Charlie Dingo by Gilles Béhat
1987 : Maurice by James Ivory
1986 : Champagne amer by Ridha Behi
1985 : Urgence by Gilles Béhat
1985 : My Little Girl by Connie Kaiserman
1984 : Mistral's Daughter by Kevin Connor (TV)
1983 : Le Grand carnaval by Alexandre Arcady
1982 : Mortelle randonnée by Claude Miller - Nominated for César Awards Best Photography
1981 : Tout feu tout flamme by Jean-Paul Rappeneau
1981 : Quartet by James Ivory
1980 : 44 ou les récits de la nuit by Moumen Smihi
1980 : La Fille prodigue by Jacques Doillon
1979 : Aurélia Steiner by Marguerite Duras
1979 : Le Navire Night by Marguerite Duras
1979 : Les Mains négatives by Marguerite Duras
1979 : Retour à la bien-aimée by Jean-François Adam
1978 : Judith Therpauve by Patrice Chéreau - Nominated for César Awards Best Photography
1977 : Dites-lui que je l'aime by Claude Miller - Nominated for César Awards Best Photography
1976 : Les Enfants du placard by Benoît Jacquot
1976 : L'Ombre des châteaux by Daniel Duval
1976 : Une sale histoire by Jean Eustache
1976 : The Savage State by Francis Girod
1975 : Le Grand délire by Denis Berry
1974 : La Chair de l'orchidée by Patrice Chéreau - Nominated for César Awards Best Photography
1974 : Sweet Movie by Dusan Makavejev
1974 : Le Sauvage by Jean-Paul Rappeneau - Nominated for César Awards Best Photography
1974 : La Solitude du chanteur de fond by Chris Marker
1973 : Je ne sais rien mais je dirai tout by Pierre Richard
1973 : M comme Mathieu by Jean-François Adam
1972 : Sex shop by Claude Berri
1972 : La Maman et la putain by Jean Eustache
1971 : Quatre nuits d'un rêveur by Robert Bresson
1971 : Quelqu'un derrière la porte by Nicolas Gessner
1971 : La Vieille fille by Jean-Pierre Blanc
1970 : Festival panafricain d'Alger by William Klein
1969 : L'Armée des ombres by Jean-Pierre Melville
1969 : Le Plus vieux métier du monde by Claude Autant-Lara, Philippe de Broca  Jean-Luc Godard
1968 : À bientôt, j'espère by Chris Marker & Mario Marret
1968 : La Chamade by Alain Cavalier
1968 : Mr. Freedom by William Klein
1968 : Le Dernier homme by Charles Bitsch
1967 : Mise à sac by Alain Cavalier
1967 : Le Roi de cœur by Philippe de Broca
1967 : Coplan sauve sa peau by Yves Boisset
1966 : La Vie de château by Jean-Paul Rappeneau
1965 : Le Mistral by Joris Ivens
1965 : Métamorphose du paysage by Éric Rohmer (TV)
1962 : Le Joli Mai by Chris Marker & Pierre Lhomme
1961 : Le Combat dans l'île by Alain Cavalier
1960 : Saint-Tropez Blues by Marcel Moussy

References

External links
 
AF Cinéma
Ecranlarge - Interview (in French)
Photos of Cinematography by Pierre Lhomme

1930 births
2019 deaths
Best Cinematography BAFTA Award winners
César Award winners
People from Boulogne-Billancourt
French cinematographers